In enzymology, a protein-arginine deiminase is an enzyme that catalyzes a form of post translational modification called arginine de-imination or citrullination:

protein L-arginine + H2O  protein L-citrulline + NH3

Thus, the two substrates of this enzyme are protein L-arginine (arginine residue inside a protein) and H2O, whereas its two products are protein L-citrulline and NH3:

This enzyme belongs to the family of hydrolases, those acting on carbon-nitrogen bonds other than peptide bonds, specifically in linear amidines.  The systematic name of this enzyme class is protein-L-arginine iminohydrolase. This enzyme is also called peptidylarginine deiminase.

Structural studies

Mammalian proteins
Mammals have 5 protein-arginine deiminases, with symbols
PADI1, PADI2, PADI3, PADI4, PADI6
except for rodents, there the letter case is different:
Padi1, Padi2, Padi3, Padi4, Padi6
The different case is just a historical artifact. It doesn't indicate that the rodent proteins are special.

References

 
 

EC 3.5.3
Enzymes of known structure